SB LiMotive was a 50:50 joint company of Bosch and Samsung SDI founded in June 2008. The joint venture developed and manufactured lithium-ion batteries for use in hybrid-, plug-in hybrid vehicles and electric vehicles. It was officially ended in September 2012 with both companies focusing on automotive batteries alone.

Milestones

In September 2008, SB LiMotive Co. Ltd. started its operations in Korea. About one month later, the German subsidiary SB LiMotive Germany GmbH was founded. In July 2009, SB LiMotive acquired US-American battery manufacturer Cobasys LLC. The groundbreaking of the cell manufacturing plant in Ulsan, Korea was two months later. In November 2010, the plant's inauguration took place.

Locations

Headquarters and cell development are located in Yongin, Gyeonggi-do, South Korea. At the second Korean site in Ulsan, the cell manufacturing plant was constructed in just 9 months. Lithium-ion cells for pre-series projects are being manufactured there since 2010 and series production will start in 2011. In Stuttgart-Feuerbach, Germany, battery systems are developed and prototypes built. At its location in Germany, SB LiMotive has also built up a global team for sales, marketing, and management of key accounts. In 2009, SB LiMotive acquired the U.S. company Cobasys with its two sites in Orion Township, Michigan, and Springboro, Ohio. Nickel-metal hydride batteries are being manufactured there and the location is now also used to support customers with the engineering of lithium-ion battery packs. At all locations, SB LiMotive employs worldwide some 700 associates in total (as of end of 2010).

Portfolio

SB LiMotive provides lithium-ion energy storage solutions from single cells to complete battery systems. They can be used in all vehicles from micro-hybrid to full electric vehicles. Additionally, the joint venture supports its customers with engineering services for software, battery management services and cooling systems.

Ownership Structure

SB LiMotive is a 50:50 joint venture between Samsung SDI and Robert Bosch GmbH. Mr. Jingun Lee is President of SB LiMotive and Dr. Joachim Fetzer is Executive Vice President.

Customers

SB LiMotive will supply lithium-ion battery cells to BMW for its electric vehicles, which are part of the "Megacity Vehicle" project. The German automaker will install the battery cells into the EVs, which will go into series production in 2013.

Secondly, SB LiMotive will supply complete lithium-ion battery systems for the Fiat 500 EV.  The battery system will be developed in Orion, Michigan, the production of cells will be in Ulsan, and the assembly of the battery pack will be in Springboro, Ohio /USA. Chrysler intends to bring the Fiat 500EV to the US market from 2012 on. The drive train consists of a high power electric powertrain module, advanced lithium-ion battery and an EV control
unit to manage power flows. Vehicle and powertrain will be developed at Chrysler headquarters in Auburn Hills, Michigan.

Dissolution 

In March 2012, after four years, the dissolution of the joint venture was announced. Bosch received about 45 million Euros from Samsung, while Samsung kept the lithium-ion cell production site in Ulsan and the development center in Giheung. Bosch absorbed the battery-system business section in Stuttgart-Feuerbach. American company Cobasys LLC was integrated into Bosch. The partners agreed to a mutual access to their about 3000 patents.

See also
List of electric vehicle battery manufacturers
Electric vehicle battery

References

External links

Samsung subsidiaries
Electric vehicle battery manufacturers
Electronics companies established in 2008
2008 establishments in South Korea
Electronics companies disestablished in 2012
2012 disestablishments in South Korea